Sinocyclocheilus huaningensis is a species of ray-finned fish in the genus Sinocyclocheilus.

References 

huaningensis
Fish described in 1998